Dauricine is a plant metabolite, chemically classified as a phenol, an aromatic ether, and an isoquinoline alkaloid. It has been isolated from the Asian vine Menispermum dauricum, commonly known as Asian moonseed, and the North American vine Menispermum canadense, commonly known as Canadian moonseed. Scientists Tetsuji Kametani and  Keiichiro Fukumoto of Japan are credited with being the first to synthesize dauricine in 1964, using both the Arndt-Eistert reaction and Bischler-Napieralski reaction to do so. Dauricine has been studied in vitro for its potential to inhibit cancer cell growth and to block cardiac transmembrane Na+, K+, and Ca2+ ion currents.

References 

Calcium channel blockers
Phenols
Norsalsolinol ethers
Benzylisoquinoline alkaloids